Nicole Robert (born December 30, 1954 in Saint-Bruno, Quebec) is a Canadian former handball player who competed in the 1976 Summer Olympics.

She was part of the Canadian handball team, which finished sixth in the Olympic tournament. She played four matches and scored ten goals.

References
 Profile 

1954 births
Living people
Canadian female handball players
Olympic handball players of Canada
Handball players at the 1976 Summer Olympics
Sportspeople from Quebec
People from Saint-Bruno-de-Montarville